Eristalinus barclayi is a species of African hoverfly found in Malawi. It resembles the widespread Eristalinus taeniops in its striped eyes but differs in having a strongly marked striped thorax.

References

Diptera of Africa
Eristalinae
Insects described in 1915